Nikisha B. Jariwala (born 14 November 1985;) is an Indian computer scientist. She is a professor in Smt. Tanuben & Dr. Manubhai Trivedi College of Information Science. She is recognized for her work in devising a computer model for converting Indian text into Braille.

Education and research 
Jariwala is a post graduate from Veer Narmad South Gujarat University. She completed her masters in computer application at Shrimad Rajchandra Institute of Management and Computer Application in Bardoli, Gujarat, and her Ph.D. in computer science and information technology at Uka Tarsadia University in Bardoli. Her work on translating Indian regional languages in Braille was supported through a grant from The Gujarat Council on Science and Technology.

Selected publications

Awards 
 2016: Trend Setter Award by GIS (Gujarat Innovation Society)

References 

1985 births
Living people
Indian computer scientists
Academic staff of Veer Narmad South Gujarat University
Women educators from Gujarat
21st-century women educators
Indian women computer scientists